Panopea is a Nereid of Greek mythology.

Panopea may also refer to:
 Panopea (bivalve), a genus of bivalve in the family Hiatellidae
 Panopea, a genus of moths in the family Geometridae; synonym of Epiphryne

See also 
 70 Panopaea, an asteroid